Türyançay (also, Turyançay and Turianchay) is a village in the Agdash Rayon of Azerbaijan. The village forms part of the municipality of Dəhnəxəlil.

References 

Populated places in Agdash District